Ashrul Syafeeq is a Singaporean footballer who plays for Hougang United as a defender.

Club career

Young Lions FC

Ashrul began his professional football career with Garena Young Lions in the Sleague in 2016.  He had also played prime league football with teams like Geylang International and Hougang United.

Balestier Khalsa
In December 2016, Ashrul was said to have signed for Balestier Khalsa as the Young Lions team only want players who are born 1995 and/or after as they prepare for the 2017 SEA Games to be held in Kuala Lumpur.

Hougang United
After being released by Balestier at the end of the 2017 season, Ashrul agreed to join Hougang United for the 2018 season.

Personal life
He is the son of former Singapore international and Balestier player Amin Nasir who died on 15 January 2017 at the age of 48. Ashrul is also a leukaemia survivor.

References

Singaporean footballers
Living people
1994 births
Association football defenders
Young Lions FC players